is a former baseball player from Japan.  He played in the Central League for the Chunichi Dragons.

References

1973 births
Living people
Asian Games gold medalists for Japan
Asian Games medalists in baseball
Baseball players at the 1994 Asian Games
Chunichi Dragons players
Japanese baseball players
Medalists at the 1994 Asian Games